Kolayat Assembly constituency is one of constituencies of Rajasthan Legislative Assembly in the Bikaner (Lok Sabha constituency).

Kolayat Constituency covers all voters from Kolayat tehsil and parts of Bikaner tehsil, which include ILRC Deshnoke including Deshnoke Municipal Board.

References

See also 
 Member of the Legislative Assembly (India)

Bikaner district
Assembly constituencies of Rajasthan